Ionuț Daniel Vînă (born 20 February 1995) is a Romanian professional footballer who plays as a midfielder for Liga I club CS Universitatea Craiova.

Club career
Vînă registered his senior debut for Viitorul Constanța on 28 May 2011, aged 16, after starting in a 1–1 second division draw with Delta Tulcea. His first game in the Liga I for the team came on 30 September 2012, when he was brought on as an 87th-minute substitute for Nicolae Dică in a 1–2 loss to Rapid București.

On 11 July 2019, Vînă transferred to fellow league side FCSB for an undisclosed fee. He failed to impose himself as a starter in Bucharest, and on 31 July 2021 joined Universitatea Craiova in a swap deal which took Andrei Burlacu and Ivan Mamut in the opposite direction.

Career statistics

Club

Honours
Viitorul Constanța
Liga I: 2016–17
Cupa României: 2018–19
Supercupa României: 2019; runner-up: 2017

FCSB
 Cupa României: 2019–20
 Supercupa României runner-up: 2020

References

External links

1995 births
Living people
Sportspeople from Galați
Romanian footballers
Association football midfielders
Liga I players
Liga II players
FC Viitorul Constanța players
FC Dunărea Călărași players
FC Steaua București players
CS Universitatea Craiova players
Romania youth international footballers
Romanian expatriate footballers